These are the results of the men's K-1 slalom competition in canoeing at the 1992 Summer Olympics. The K-1 (kayak single) event is raced by one-man kayaks through a whitewater course. The venue for the 1992 Olympic competition was at La Seu d'Urgell.

Medalists

Results
The 44 competitors each took two runs through the whitewater slalom course on August 2. The best result of the runs counted for the event.

References

1992 Summer Olympics official report Volume 5.  p. 150. 
Sports-reference.com 1992 men's K-1 slalom results.
Wallechinsky, David and Jaime Loucky (2008). "Canoeing: Men's Kayak Slalom Singles". In The Complete Book of the Olympics: 2008 Edition. London: Aurum Press Limited. p. 485.

Men's Slalom K-1
Men's events at the 1992 Summer Olympics